The 1909 Victorian Amateur League was the first season of the Victorian Amateur League, the former top league in Victorian football.

Teams
Six teams competed in the league.

 Carlton United
 Fitzroy
 Melbourne United
 Prahran City
 St Kilda
 Williamstown

League table

Source:

References

External links
 Official website

1909 in Victorian soccer